Greeper laces are a novel form of shoelace which have fasteners and stops to prevent them from becoming undone.  They were invented by London optometrist Peter Greedy who spent six years developing the product and then launched it in 2009 at a footwear trade show in Düsseldorf.

See also
Lock Laces

References

External links
 Official website

Footwear accessories